Charles F. "Chub" Watson (April 5, 1915 – June 28, 1971) was an American professional basketball player. He played college basketball for Davis & Elkins College and Marshall University, as well as baseball and football for Marshall. Watson then played in the National Basketball League for the Pittsburgh Pirates in only one game during the 1938–39 season and scored 16 points.

References

1915 births
1971 deaths
American men's basketball players
Basketball players from West Virginia
Centers (basketball)
Davis & Elkins Senators men's basketball players
High school football coaches in West Virginia
Marshall Thundering Herd baseball players
Marshall Thundering Herd football players
Marshall Thundering Herd men's basketball players
People from Lewis County, West Virginia
Pittsburgh Pirates (NBL) players
Player-coaches